Neil Shepley (7 October 1899 – 14 November 1953) was an Australian cricketer. He played in one first-class match for South Australia in 1925/26.

See also
 List of South Australian representative cricketers

References

External links
 

1899 births
1953 deaths
Australian cricketers
South Australia cricketers
Cricketers from Adelaide